Ann Shaw may refer to:

Ann Shaw, character in Tammy (comics)
Ann Shaw (figure skater); see Figure skating at the 2002 Winter Olympics
 Ann Shaw (social worker), civic leader and social worker based out of Los Angeles
 Ann Shaw, South Africa, a locality in South Africa (Eastern Cape), 2 km off Middledrift

See also
Anne Shaw (disambiguation)
Anna Shaw (disambiguation)
 Ann Shaw Carter, American pilot